Colombia competed at the 2000 Summer Olympics in Sydney, Australia. Colombia won its first ever gold medal at these Olympic games. 44 competitors, 25 men and 19 women, took part in 45 events in 13 sports.

Medalists

Athletics

Men's Competition
Men's 200m
 Jimmy Pino
 Round 1 – 21.42 (→ did not advance)

Men's High Jump
 Gilmar Mayo
 Qualifying – 2.20 (→ did not advance)

Men's marathon
 José Alirio Carrasco
 Final – did not finish (→ no ranking)

Women's Competition
Women's 200m
 Felipa Palacios
 Round 1 – 23.08
 Round 2 – 23.19
 Semifinal – 23.11 (→ did not advance)

Women's 400m
 Norma González
 Round 1 – 53.34 (→ did not advance)

Women's 4 × 100 m
 Mirtha Brock, Digna Luz Murillo, Melisa Murillo, Felipa Palacios, Ximena Restrepo
 Round 1 – 44.08
 Semifinal – 44.37 (→ did not advance)

Women's Javelin Throw
 Sabina Moya
 Qualifying – 49.16 (→ did not advance)

Women's Marathon
 Iglandini González
 Final – 2:47:26 (→ 40th place)

Boxing

Men's Featherweight (– 57 kg)
Andrés Ledesma
Round 1 – Lost to Somluck Kamsing of Thailand (→ did not advance)

Men's Lightweight (– 60 kg)
José Leonardo Cruz
Round 1 – Defeated Giovanni Michael Frontin of Mauritius
Round 2 – Lost to Almazbek Raimkulov of Kyrgyzstan (→ did not advance)

Men's Welterweight (– 67 kg)
Francisco Calderón
Round 1 – Bye 
Round 2 – Lost to Oleg Saitov of Russia (→ did not advance)

Cycling

Cross Country Mountain Bike
Men's Mountain Bike
 Diego Garavito
 Final – did not finish (→ no ranking)

Women's Mountain Bike
 Flor Marina Delgadillo
 Final – 2:03:17.10 (→ 24th place)

Road Cycling
Men's Individual Time Trial
 Víctor Hugo Peña
 Final – 1:01:10 (→ 24th place)

Men's Road Race
 Ruber Marín
 Final – 5:30:46 (→ 31st place)
 Santiago Botero
 Final – did not finish (→ no ranking)
 Jhon García
 Final – did not finish (→ no ranking)
 Fredy Gonzalez
 Final – did not finish (→ no ranking)
 Víctor Hugo Peña
 Final – did not finish (→ no ranking)

Track Cycling

Men's Competition
Men's Point Race
Marlon Pérez
Points – 0
Laps Down – 2 (→ 21st place)

Women's Competition
Women's Individual Pursuit
María Luisa Calle
Qualifying – 03:44.395 (→ did not advance)

Women's Point Race
María Luisa Calle
Points – 2 (→ 11th place)

Diving

Men's 3 Metre Springboard
 Juan Urán
 Preliminary – 308.1 (→ did not advance, 41st place)

Men's 10 Metre Platform
 Juan Urán
 Preliminary – 333.93 (→ did not advance, 27th place)

Women's 3 Metre Springboard
 Diana Pineda
 Preliminary – 220.68 (→ did not advance, 34th place)

Equestrianism

Fencing

Two fencers, one man and one woman, represented Colombia in 2000.

Men's épée
 Mauricio Rivas

Women's épée
 Ángela María Espinosa

Shooting

Swimming

Men's 50m Freestyle
 Camilo Becerra
 Preliminary Heat – 23.63 (→ did not advance)

Men's 100m Freestyle
 Fernando Jácome
 Preliminary Heat – 52.24 (→ did not advance)

Men's 200m Freestyle
 Fernando Jácome
 Preliminary Heat – 1:54.17 (→ did not advance)

Men's 100m Backstroke
 Germán Martínez
 Preliminary Heat – 59.94 (→ did not advance)

Men's 200m Backstroke
 Alejandro Bermúdez
 Preliminary Heat – 02:03.43 (→ did not advance)

Men's 400m Individual Medley
 Alejandro Bermúdez
 Preliminary Heat – 04:29.42 (→ did not advance)

Women's 100m Breaststroke
 Isabel Ceballos
 Preliminary Heat – 01:11.90 (→ did not advance)

Women's 200m Breaststroke
 Isabel Ceballos
 Preliminary Heat – 02:34.09 (→ did not advance)

Taekwondo

Tennis

Triathlon

Women's Competition:
 Maria Morales – 2:13:43.38 (→ 37th place)

Weightlifting

Men

Women

Wrestling

See also
Sports in Colombia
Colombia at the 1999 Pan American Games

Notes

Wallechinsky, David (2004). The Complete Book of the Summer Olympics (Athens 2004 Edition). Toronto, Canada. . 
International Olympic Committee (2001). The Results. Retrieved 12 November 2005.
Sydney Organising Committee for the Olympic Games (2001). Official Report of the XXVII Olympiad Volume 1: Preparing for the Games. Retrieved 20 November 2005.
Sydney Organising Committee for the Olympic Games (2001). Official Report of the XXVII Olympiad Volume 2: Celebrating the Games. Retrieved 20 November 2005.
Sydney Organising Committee for the Olympic Games (2001). The Results. Retrieved 20 November 2005.
International Olympic Committee Web Site

References

Nations at the 2000 Summer Olympics
2000 Summer Olympics
Summer Olympics